Basketball Wives is an American reality television series on VH1. It chronicles the lives of women who have been romantically linked to professional basketball players in the National Basketball Association. 

The original incarnation was filmed in Miami, Florida and premiered on April 11, 2010. Basketball Wives LA, a spin-off based in Los Angeles, premiered on August 29, 2011. 

Both shows ran for five seasons, with the first incarnation of Basketball Wives ending on October 21, 2013 and Basketball Wives LA ending on October 23, 2016. From season six, which premiered on April 17, 2017, the casts of both shows were combined.

Series overview

Basketball Wives

Season 1 (2010)

Season 2 (2010–11)

Season 3 (2011)

Season 4 (2012)

Season 5 (2013)

Season 6 (2017)

Season 7 (2018)

Season 8 (2019)

Season 9 (2021)

Season 10 (2022–23)

Basketball Wives LA

Season 1 (2011)

Season 2 (2012)

Season 3 (2014)

Season 4 (2015)

Season 5 (2016)

References

Lists of reality television series episodes